Nanoribbon may refer to:

 Graphene nanoribbons
 Silicene nanoribbons
 Boron nitride nanoribbons
 Gallium(III) oxide nanoribbons
 titanate nanoribbons - see titanium dioxide
 Phosphorene nanoribbons